"Jiāyoú! Ni You ME!" is a Mandarin pop duet song by Chinese singer Alan featuring Vision Wei. It was released as Alan's third Chinese single on October 29, 2008, as a digital download in Asia and as a mini-CD in Hong Kong. The song was used to encourage Chinese students and promote Epson's ME 30/300 printer series in China, which she became a spokesperson of in September 2008.

Alan and Wei Chen became acquainted with each other when they were the only two selected to represent Mainland China at the 9th Asian New Singer Competition in 2006.

Composition
The lyrics were written by Francis Lee, who had previously written the lyrics of Alan's "Xin Zhan: Red Cliff". The music was composed by Bi Kuo Yong and arranged by Chen Lei.

Track listing
 Digital download
 "Jiāyoú! Ni You ME!" (Chinese: 加油！你有ME; Pinyin: Jiāyoú! Ni You ME!; Go! You Have ME!) – 3:21

 Mini-CD
 "Jiāyoú! Ni You ME!"
 "Jiāyoú! Ni You ME!" (Instrumental Version)

2008 singles
Alan Dawa Dolma songs
2008 songs
Avex Trax singles